The Poles of Cold are the places in the southern and northern hemispheres where the lowest air temperatures have been recorded.

Southern hemisphere

This is the lowest naturally occurring temperature ever recorded on Earth.

It is generally thought that Vostok is not the coldest place in Antarctica, and there are locations (notably, Dome A) that are modestly colder on average. The now inactive Plateau Station, located on the central Antarctic plateau, recorded an average yearly temperature that was consistently lower than that of Vostok Station during the 37-month period that it was active in the late 1960s, with its average for the coldest month being several degrees lower than the same statistic for Vostok. Plateau Station never recorded a temperature that surpassed the record low set at Vostok. However, temperatures at Plateau Station were only recorded during the 37 months that it was active. Had a lower temperature than the Vostok record occurred there at a later date, it would never have been recorded.

Monitoring stations in Antarctica are few and far between; prior to 1995, Vostok was the only research station on the Antarctic Plateau above the elevation of 3,000 m (with the exception of Plateau Station during the brief period that it was active in the 1960s), with no other stations for several hundred kilometers in any direction. Temperatures below , if they did occur elsewhere, would not have been recorded. The automatic weather station at Dome A was only installed in 2005, and has recorded  as the coldest so far (2010). The extreme low temperatures are found in hollows slightly below the peak of the ice ridge, where cold air gets trapped as it flows downhill, and since the same low temperature ranges were detected at several different sites along the ridge across multiple years, it is thought this may be the lowest temperature achievable under local atmospheric conditions.

Northern hemisphere 
In the northern hemisphere, there are two towns in Sakha, Russia that compete for the title of "Pole of Cold". These are Verkhoyansk (located at ) and Oymyakon (located at ). However the World Meteorological Organization has recognized in 2020 a temperature of - 69.6°C (-93.3°F) measured near the topographic summit of the Greenland Ice Sheet on 22 December 1991, as the lowest in the Northern Hemisphere. The record was measured at an automatic weather station and was uncovered after nearly 30 years. 

One can still find this incorrect value in some literature.

At the time, this was the coldest reliably measured temperature for the Northern Hemisphere. The weather station is in a valley between Oymyakon and Tomtor. The average temperature in Oymyakon has risen about 2.7 degrees Celsius since preindustrial times.

The WMO validated the metadata and observations and was able to conclude that the observation was credible in terms of instrument calibration, monitoring of the station and the synoptic situation. The WMO Rapporteur accepted the observation as the officially lowest observed near‐surface air temperature for the Northern and Western Hemispheres.

See also

List of weather records
Lowest temperature recorded on Earth
Life in the Freezer
Coldest place in the universe

References

External links

Living in Antarctica
Ask about life in the Pole of Cold
Visit the Pole of Cold

Polar regions of the Earth
Geography of Antarctica
Geography of the Arctic
Cold
Climate of Antarctica
Weather extremes of Earth
Princess Elizabeth Land